Cyclophora pendulinaria, the sweetfern geometer moth or pearly-grey wave, is a moth in the  family Geometridae.

Overview
It is found in North America, where it is found from Newfoundland and Labrador west to the Yukon and coastal British Columbia, south to Georgia in the east. The habitat consists of moist or mesic forests.

The wingspan is 17–26 mm. The wings vary from white to gray or even blackish-brown. Adults have been recorded on wing from April to October.

The larvae feed on the leaves of Comptonia and Alnus  species. The larvae are variable in colour, ranging from green to yellow, orange brown or purple-brown. The species overwinters in the pupal stage.

References

Moths described in 1857
pendulinaria
Moths of North America